Dum Dum Cantonment metro station, is a station of line 4 of Kolkata Metro. It is situated just beside the Dum Dum Cantonment railway station. This station was proposed in Line 4, in the budget of 2010–11. It is also the part of the integration of old line of Circular Railway from Dum Dum Cantt. to Biman Bandar.

The Station

Structure 
This is an elevated station having 2 levels.

Complex

Layout

Connections

Auto 
6 Auto services available from this station. Autos available towards Nager Bazar More, Pramod Nagar Bazar, Matkol, Shibtala, Matish Roy Setu and Dudhpukur.

Bus 
Bus route number 30D serves the station. One irregular service from WBTC route no. M-34 towards Esplanade also available sometimes.

Rail 
 Dum Dum Cantonment railway station is just beside the metro station.

Air 
Netaji Subhash Chandra Bose International Airport is just 3.9 km away from the station which will be connected via this metro line. The Biman Bandar metro station which will serve the airport is the fourth station of Noapara to Barasat bound trains.

Entry/Exits 

3 Entry/Exit gates are there in this station. One at the North end, one at the South end and one gate from Mezzanine floor will directly connects towards existing FOB of Dum Dum Cantonment railway station

References 

Kolkata Metro stations
Railway stations opened in 2013
Railway stations in Kolkata